Torrejón de Ardoz is a municipality in Madrid metropolitan area, Spain.

Torrejón may also refer to:

Places
 Torrejón Air Base, military air base in Torrejón de Ardoz
 Madrid–Torrejón Airport, airport in Torrejón de Ardoz
 Torrejón el Rubio, municipality in Extremadura, Spain
 Torrejón del Rey, municipality in Castile La Mancha, Spain
 Torrejón de Velasco, municipality in Community of Madrid, Spain
 Torrejón de la Calzada, municipality in Community of Madrid, Spain

Organisations
 AD Torrejón CF, football club in Torrejón de Ardoz
 AD Torrejón, former football club in Torrejón de Ardoz

People
 Marc Torrejón Moya (born 1986), Spanish footballer
 Marta Torrejón Moya (born 1990), Spanish footballer
 Claudio Torrejón (born 1993), Peruvian footballer
 Tomás de Torrejón y Velasco (1644–1728), Spanish/Peruvian composer
 Susana Torrejón (born 1960), Spanish canoeist